Anayevo is a rural locality (a selo), administrative centre of Anayevskoye Rural Locality of Zubovo-Polyansky District, Mordovia, Russia.

Etymology
The name derived from pre-Christian Moksha name Anai.

History
Mentioned in 1614 among 9 villages of Steldema belyak together with "Pashatova, Shapkino, Podlyasova, Selische, Paramzina, Zheravkina, Kargashina, 1/2 Avdalova".

Geography 
Anayevo is located 29 km of Zubova Polyana (the district's administrative centre) by road and 12 km of Vad railawaystation.

Sources

References 

Rural localities in Mordovia
Zubovo-Polyansky District
Spassky Uyezd (Tambov Governorate)